The Banker is a 2015 Nigerian drama film, produced and directed by Emem Isong and Ikechukwu Onyeka respectively. The film starred Mbong Amata, Maureen Okpoko, Belinda Effah and Seun Akindele. It premiered at Civic Center, Lagos on May 16, 2015.

The story is centered on the how female bankers use their sexuality to get optimal benefits from prospective customers. It also visits the circumstances and the emotional pain they go through in fulfilling corporate target, while addressing the stereotypical understanding from in-laws, and women whose husband deal with female bankers in Nigeria.

Plot 
Chinwe (Mbong Amata) is a female banker who is pressured professionally to use any means possible to ensure wealthy male clients open monetary accounts, irrespective of their demands. Her future father-in-law is of the opinion that all female bankers are promiscuous and wouldn't approve her marriage to his son, this leads him to sending several of his wealthy friends as potential client to try to lure her to have a sexual relationship with them, to see if she will stand her ground.

Cast 
Mbong Amata as Chinwe
Ifeanyi Kalu as Kunle jnr
Maureen Okpoko as Vivian
Seun Akindele as David
Belinda Effah as Daisy Aburi

Reception 
Despite having a 2.5 score on Nollywood Reinvented, It was heavily criticized for lacking "originality" and being "very predictable". The film was also described as being unrealistic in some instance, however the site noted that the introduction of Seun Akindele in the latter part of the film brought some form of life to it.

On talkafricanmovies, a review site that either "recommends" or "ejects" films; The Banker was "recommended", with the writer praising its "straight-to-the-point" approach. However, it felt the direction of the script was not completely in tune with reality. It also posited that the story should have been more diverse, while also praising the portrayal by Seun Akindele in the film.

References

English-language Nigerian films
2010s English-language films
Nigerian drama films